Adenomera hylaedactyla is a species of frog in the family Leptodactylidae.
It is found in Argentina, Bolivia, Brazil, Colombia, Ecuador, French Guiana, Guyana, Paraguay, Peru, Suriname, Trinidad and Tobago, and Venezuela.
Its natural habitats are subtropical or tropical moist lowland forests, subtropical or tropical dry lowland grassland, rivers, swamps, intermittent freshwater marshes, pastureland, rural gardens, heavily degraded former forest, and canals and ditches.

References

Adenomera
Amphibians of Argentina
Amphibians of Bolivia
Amphibians of Brazil
Amphibians of Colombia
Amphibians of Ecuador
Amphibians of French Guiana
Amphibians of Guyana
Amphibians of Paraguay
Amphibians of Peru
Amphibians of Suriname
Amphibians of Trinidad and Tobago
Amphibians of Venezuela
Amphibians described in 1868
Taxonomy articles created by Polbot